Kazim Ali (born April 5, 1971) is an American poet, novelist, essayist, and professor. His most recent books are Inquisition (Wesleyan University Press, 2018) and
All One's Blue (Harper Collins India, 2016). His honors include an Individual Excellence Award from the Ohio Arts Council. His poetry and essays have been featured in many literary journals and magazines including The American Poetry Review, Boston Review, Barrow Street, Jubilat, The Iowa Review, West Branch and Massachusetts Review, and in anthologies including The Best American Poetry 2007.

Life
He was born in the UK to parents of Indian descent, and raised in Canada and the United States. Kazim Ali received a B.A. and an M.A. in English Literature from the University at Albany, and an MFA in creative writing from New York University.

In 2003, he co-founded the independent press Nightboat Books, served as its publisher from 2004 to 2007, and currently serves as a founding editor.

Ali is professor of literature and creative Writing at University of California, San Diego and has taught in the Stonecoast MFA Program in Creative Writing at the University of Southern Maine. Previously, he taught in the Liberal Arts Department of The Culinary Institute of America, at Shippensburg University of Pennsylvania, at Monroe College, and at Oberlin College.

Awards and honors
2014 Ohioana Book Award in poetry for Sky Ward
2014 Best Translated Book Award, Poetry, one of two runners-up for The Oasis of Now by Sohrab Sepehri, translated from the Persian by Kazim Ali and Mohammad Jafar Mahallati
2009 Individual Excellence Award from the Ohio Arts Council

Published works 
Poetry

 The Far Mosque (Alice James Books, 2005)
 The Fortieth Day (BOA Editions, Ltd., 2008)
 Bright Felon (Wesleyan University Press, 2009)
 Sky Ward (Wesleyan, 2013)
 All One's Blue (Harper Collins India, 2016)
 Inquisition (Wesleyan University Press, 2018)

Fiction

 Quinn’s Passage (BlazeVOX Books, 2004)
 The Disappearance of Seth (Etruscan Press, 2009)
 Wind Instrument (Spork Press, 2014)
 Uncle Sharif's Life in Music (Sibling Rivalry Press, 2016)
 The Secret Room (Kaya Press, 2017)

Nonfiction

 Orange Alert: Essays on Poetry, Art and the Architecture of Silence (University of Michigan Press, 2010)
 Fasting for Ramadan: Notes on a Spiritual Practice (Tupelo Press, 2011)
 Resident Alien: On Border-Crossing and the Undocumented Divine (University of Michigan Press, 2015)
 Anaïs Nin: An Unprofessional Study (Agape Editions, 2017)
 Silver Road: Essays, Maps & Calligraphies (Tupelo Press, 2018)
Northern Light: Power, Land, and the Memory of Water (Goose Lane Editions / Milkweed Editions, 2021)

Translations

 Water's Footfall, Poems of Sohrab Sepehri, translated by Kazim Ali and Mohammad Jafar Mahallati (Omnidawn Press, 2011). .
 The Oasis of Now,  Poems of Sohrab Sepehri, translated from the Persian by Kazim Ali and Mohammad Jafar Mahallati (BOA, 2013). .
 L'Amour by Marguerite Duras (Open Letter Books, 2013)
 Abahn Sabana David by Marguerite Duras (Open Letter Books, 2016)

Anthologies 
 Mad Heart Be Brave: Essays on the Poetry of Agha Shahid Ali (University of Michigan Press, 2017)

References

Sources 
Oberlin College: Creative Writing Department > Faculty Bio > Kazim Ali
 BOA Editions > Author Page > Kazim Ali
 Author Website
 University of Southern Maine: Stonecoast MFA in Creative Writing > Faculty Profile > Kazim Ali

External links 
 Video: Poetry Reading by Kazim Ali/Two short poems
 Audio: Kazim Ali Reading for Fishousepoems.org
 Essay: National Book Critics Circle Blog > Small Press Spotlight: Kazim Ali > A mini-essay: A Brief Poetics: to Layla Al-Attar > August 16, 2008
 Essay: Poetry Foundation Blog Posting of Poetry Is Dangerous > By Kazim Ali
 Interview: KickingWind.com > October 15, 2006 > Every Other Day Interview with Kazim Ali
 Under A Warm Green Linden: Interview with Kazim Ali on The Far Mosque

Poets from Ohio
Novelists from Ohio
New York University alumni
University at Albany, SUNY alumni
Living people
Oberlin College faculty
21st-century American novelists
1971 births
Gay novelists
Gay poets
American novelists of Indian descent
Muslim writers
American Muslims
American male novelists
21st-century American poets
American male poets
American male essayists
21st-century American essayists
21st-century American male writers
American LGBT poets
American LGBT novelists
Gay Muslims
American gay writers